The Pagee River rises on the south eastern flank of Berry Hill (a  summit) just below the  contour at  near Crawle Pen in Saint Mary. It reaches the sea  later at Pagee Beach also in Saint Mary.

References

Rivers of Jamaica